Celebrity Playhouse is an American anthology series that aired on Syndication from September 1955, to June 1956.

Episodes were repeats of dramas that were originally shown on Schlitz Playhouse of Stars. Celebrity Playhouse was produced by Screen Gems.

Recurring guest stars

Other Notable Guest Stars
Raymond Burr
Dane Clark
Joseph Cotten
Wendell Corey
Linda Darnell
Laraine Day
Joanne Dru
Vince Edwards
Jane Greer
Paul Henreid
Louis Jourdan
Thomas Mitchell (actor)
Hugh O'Brian
Pat O'Brien (actor)
Cliff Robertson
Edward G. Robinson
Ann Sheridan
Gale Storm
Teresa Wright

Episodes

References

External links
Celebrity Playhouse at CVTA with episode list
 

1955 American television series debuts
1956 American television series endings
1950s American anthology television series
1950s American drama television series
Black-and-white American television shows
English-language television shows
NBC original programming
Television series by Screen Gems
First-run syndicated television programs in the United States